The 1971–72 season was the 73rd season for FC Barcelona.

La Liga

League table

Results

External links

webdelcule.com

FC Barcelona seasons
Barcelona